Kuzuculu is a town in Dörtyol district of  Hatay Province, Turkey. The population was 11287 as of 2012. The town was founded about five centuries ago by an Ottoman pasha named Emir Ali who built a watermill on the creek just south of the settlement. The first settlers were from Central Anatolia. They owned sheep herds and used this settlement as a kışlak (winter quarters for the herd). The name of the town refers to these early settlers, as Kuzucu means lamb owner. Kuzuculu was declared a seat of township in 1957.

References

Populated places in Hatay Province
Populated coastal places in Turkey
Towns in Turkey
Dörtyol District